Cyrille Van Hauwaert (Moorslede, 16 December 1883 – Zellik, 15 February 1974) was a Belgian professional road bicycle racer, known for winning classics as Bordeaux–Paris (1907 and 1909), Milan–San Remo and Paris–Roubaix (both 1908). In 1909 he won the first stage of the Tour de France, and was leading the general classification for one day.

In 1908, prior to winning Milan–San Remo, Van Hauwaert had traveled by bike from Belgium to the start in Milan, by means of training.

Major results

1907
Bordeaux–Paris
1908
Milan–San Remo
Paris–Roubaix
1909
Bordeaux–Paris
 Belgian National Road Race Championships
 2 stages Tour of Belgium
Tour de France:
Winner stage 1
5th place overall classification
1910
Tour de France:
4th place overall classification
Paris - Menin
1914
Six days of Brussels
1915
Six days of Brussels

References

External links 

Belgian male cyclists
1883 births
1974 deaths
Belgian Tour de France stage winners
Sportspeople from West Flanders
People from Moorslede